The New York Community Trust is the community foundation for New York City, with divisions in Westchester and Long Island. It is one of the oldest and largest community foundations in the United States and one of the largest funders of New York City's nonprofits.

As a public charity, the trust administers more than 2,000 charitable funds created by individuals, families, and businesses. From these funds, it makes grants to nonprofits that improve the quality of life of New Yorkers, primarily in the metropolitan area. The foundation's competitive grantmaking program focuses on improving the lives of all New Yorkers, with an emphasis on promoting healthy lives, promising futures, and thriving communities. It relies on experts, creativity, and resources to address challenging issues, create opportunities, and ensure a better quality of life for all New Yorkers today and tomorrow.

Financials 
In 2020, The New York Community Trust made grants of more than $274 million from assets of $3.1 billion in more than 2,000 charitable funds. As of 2018, the trust is ranked as the Foundation Center's 5th largest community foundation by asset size, and the 11th largest foundation in New York by asset size in Crain's New York Business.

Distribution committee 
Twelve New Yorkers selected for their understanding of philanthropic needs serve as the Distribution Committee, or the board, of The New York Community Trust. Six are nominated by New York City civic authorities: one by New York City's mayor, one by the chief judge of the U.S. Court of Appeals for the Second Circuit, one by the chairman of the Partnership for New York City, one by the chairman of Lincoln Center for the Performing Arts, and one each by the presidents of the Association of the Bar of the City of New York and the New York Academy of Medicine.

Distribution committee members:
 Fernando Bohorquez, Jr., partner, BakerHostetler
 Jamie Drake, founder and principal, Drake/Anderson
 Obaid (Obi) Khan, chief financial officer, Tishman Realty Corporation
 Mahmoud A. Mamdani, vice chairman and managing director, Morgan Stanley/Investment Banking Division
 Valerie Peltier, chair; managing director, Tishman Speyer
 Stephen C. Robinson, partner, Skadden, Arps, Slate, Meagher & Flom LLP
 Judith O. Rubin, chairman, Playwrights Horizons
 Jane E. Salmon, M.D., Collette Kean Research Chair and Director, Lupus and APS Center of Excellence at Hospital for Special Surgery
 Mali Sananikone Gaw, co-founder, Lincoln Center Family Council
 Barron (Buzz) Tenny, former executive VP, secretary, and general counsel, Ford Foundation
 Ann Unterberg, chairman: Lincoln Center Education, Monmouth Medical Center Foundation

Consulting board members

 Charlynn Goins, former director: Fannie Mae, AXA Financial, The Mainstay Funds
 Robert M. Kaufman, partner, Proskauer Rose LLP; Vice Chairman Emeritus, the New York Community Trust
 Roger J. Maldonado, partner, Smith Gambrell & Russell, LLP
 Anne Moore, M.D., professor of clinical medicine, Weill Cornell Medicine; NewYork–Presbyterian Hospital
 Anne Sidamon-Eristoff, chairwoman emerita, American Museum of Natural History
 Jason H. Wright, principal, Geer Mountain Holdings, LLC

History 
The New York Community Trust was founded in 1924 by 11 banks to more effectively make grants from the charitable trusts they held. The first fund in the trust was established by Rosebel G. Schiff, who gave $1,000 to create the Theresa E. Bernholz Fund. Schiff asked that the prize go to a girl from P.S. 9 who “earned the highest respect of her teachers.” 

In 1931, with the help of electrical engineer and philanthropist William S. Barstow and his wife, Francoise Barstow, The trust established the nation's first donor-advised fund. During the Great Depression of the 1930s, The trust focused all available discretionary funds on helping the unemployed. In 1957, The trust installed the first of 309 "Landmarks of New York" plaques, which are still visible today on architecturally and historically important buildings all over the city.

The Westchester and Long Island Community Foundations were founded by the trust in 1975 and 1978, respectively. In 1983, in the early years of the AIDS crisis, the foundation made the first grant for HIV research from a private institution. It then created the New York City AIDS Fund, which operated from 1989 to 2014. In the wake of the terrorist attacks in 2001, The trust and the United Way of New York City created the September 11th Fund, which distributed more than $528 million to victims, families, and affected communities. Businesses and nonprofits received grants to help rebuild and revitalize lower Manhattan.

The trust also made early grants to plan the High Line, convert Governors Island into a public park, create the Brooklyn Greenway, and garner public support for an overhaul of St. Mary's Park in the Bronx.

Program areas 
The trust's grants affect many facets of city life, including:

Fight Poverty: Trust grantmaking tackles the systemic causes of poverty, as well as homelessness, barriers to employment, and income inequality. It also improves the field of social work and funds efforts to improve social service delivery.
 Champion Justice: Grassroots groups rely on Trust grants to press for criminal justice reform, defend women's rights, protect immigrants, provide legal services, and inspire civic action.
 Support LGBTQ New York: The trust works to support advocacy for LGBTQ rights, improve health services, build safe communities for LGBTQ youth and older adults, and preserve historic sites, such as the Alice Austen House.
 Help Children & Teens: The trust helps create promising futures for young New Yorkers from early childhood to the workplace. Grantees include organizations that address the needs of children with disabilities and those in foster care.
 Improve Education: Grants enable students, parents, and educators to advocate for better schools, improve early childhood programs and literacy, teach STEM, support English-language learners, and prepare students for college.
 Make New York Healthier: The trust works to improve the health care system, including programs addressing behavioral health and substance misuse. It also funds biomedical research. In addition, it supports programs and advocacy to improve the quality of life for people with physical and intellectual disabilities.
 Protect the Environment: The trust is facing climate change by encouraging resilient cities, advocating for stronger environmental policies, reducing pollution, and protecting wildlife and the waterfront.
 Strengthen the Arts: Trust grants bolster the arts across all five boroughs, support arts education, diversify the talent pipeline for artists and arts groups, create affordable workspaces for artists, and preserve history. Notable programs include the Van Lier Fellowships for pre- and post-college artists from underrepresented backgrounds.
 Care for Older Adults: The trust supports groups that help older adults age at home; meet their health, nutrition, social, and legal needs; and make the city a better place to grow old.

Funder collaboratives 
The New York Community Trust brings foundations together to pool resources to address a range of issues in the region. The trust has worked with more than 167 foundations and individual donors through 25 collaboratives since 1977, distributing $139 million as of 2019. Some of these collaborations focus on sharing ideas; others are more structured, with governance and administration shaped to fit the needs of the participating funders. Some address an immediate issue, while others last for decades.
 Early Childhood Partners Fund was established in 2017 to ensure that all children in New York City enter kindergarten prepared for lifelong success. It supports efforts that expand access to high-quality early childhood services and improve the systems that influence the well-being of New York City's young children, especially those from low-income families.  
 Foster Care Excellence Fund was established in 2017 to improve foster care services and outcomes in New York City.  It makes grants to ensure more children in foster care live with relatives, recruit and retain qualified foster parents, and provide young people with the comprehensive services they need to thrive as adults.
 Fund for New Citizens helps immigrants in New York City. It was started in 1987 and makes grants to strengthen immigrant-led organizations, challenge punitive immigration laws, promote pro-immigrant policies at the State and City levels, foster coalitions of immigration advocates and others with shared concerns, and support partnerships among legal services organizations and community groups.
 Mosaic Network and Fund was established in 2018 to direct more resources to arts groups led by, created for, and accountable to African, Latinx, Asian, Arab, and Native American (ALAANA) people. It fosters a learning community of arts funders and practitioners, makes flexible, multi-year grants to City-based ALAANA arts groups, and connects funders with new grantees.
 New York City Workforce Development Fund was established in 2001 by the NYC Workforce Funders, a group of foundations interested in employment issues. It makes grants for technical and financial assistance to youth and adult employment organizations, and sector-focused strategies. The funders work closely with the city's Department of Small Business Services, which houses the New York Alliance for Careers in Healthcare, an effort started by the trust and the Workforce Funders.
 New York State Census Equity Fund was established in 2018 to ensure a fair and accurate census count for New York State. The Fund will make two rounds of grants in 2019—one for training and technical resources to prepare organizations planning census-related work, and another to support get-out-the-count activities in the months and weeks leading up to Census Day on April 1, 2020.
 The NYC COVID-19 Response & Impact Fund was created in March 2020 to aid nonprofit service providers struggling with the initial health and economic effects of the coronavirus pandemic. It raised $112 million from more than 1,300 donors. It distributed nearly $73 million in grants through the trust and $37 million in no-interest loans through the Nonprofit Finance Fund to NYC-based nonprofits.  Recipient organizations included human service and arts and cultural nonprofits.  The fund helped with needs including protective equipment, cleaning supplies, technological assistance to work remotely, and support to reduce the impact of financial losses. Learn more about the fund and its donors here. See a list of grantee organizations here. The fund was created to provide short-term emergency relief and terminated in 2021.
 GoVoteNYC was created in January 2021 in anticipation of that year's local elections.  New Yorkers elected a new mayor, public advocate, and comptroller; five new borough presidents; and 35 (out of 51) new City Council members; and the city implemented ranked choice voting for the first time.  Long-term, nonpartisan civic engagement goals include: to increase voter participation and narrow participation gaps; increase the capacity of grantees to educate, engage, and mobilize voters; strengthen coordination among organizations building a more engaged citizenry; foster a “voter-friendly,” fair, and barrier-free election system; and engage the philanthropic community to bolster civic participation in NYC.

Special programs 
In 2015, anticipating the need to train a diverse new generation of nonprofit leaders, the organization created The New York Community Trust Leadership Fellows program at the Austin W. Marxe School of Public and International Affairs at Baruch College. Fellows attend classes at Baruch and graduate with a certificate in Nonprofit Management. A book was written that provides a new leadership framework for the next generation of nonprofit professionals based on five years of data collected from the New York Community Trust Leadership Fellowship. The free book is called Leadership Standpoints: A Practical Framework for the Next Generation of Nonprofit Leaders, was published online by Cambridge University Press in 2021 

The trust provides additional support to grantees through recurring grants to technical assistance groups, including Lawyers’ Alliance, Community Resource Exchange, Support Center for Nonprofit Management, and Cause Effective. Workshops on topics including program evaluation and racial equity also are available to grantees by invitation.

Publications 
The trust publishes the following periodicals. They are free and subscribers can receive them by mail or email.

 Grants Newsletters highlight stories of impact, and are issued four times a year.
 Tax and Estate Planning Professional Notes is a newsletter produced for attorneys and other professional advisors. 
 Annual Reports are available online.

It has also published the following reports
 Power of Permanence analyzes 20 years of philanthropic data from New York City to understand the causes donors care about most, alongside the various trends in philanthropy over time.
 The Power of Funder Collaboration explores 40 years of collaborative funds, efforts designed to combine philanthropic power to address a particular area or any acute long-term and short-term needs.

In the news 
The trust regularly appears in the press. Media coverage includes projects funded by the trust, as well as expertise on the philanthropic sector and policy issues facing New York.

 Health grants featured in Crain's Health Pulse include an effort to combat the opioid crisis in New York.
 Inside Philanthropy reported on the trust's rapid-response philanthropy and grants to bolster early childhood programs. 
 Forbes featured the trust-funded “Culture Pass” program that provides access to museums and cultural centers for any New Yorker with a library card.
 City & State Magazine ranked the trust on its 2018 “Nonprofit Power 50” list.
 NBC New York reported on the Self-Sufficiency Report on poverty in New York, funded by the trust.
 The New York Times reported on the impact of small donations. 
 A grant to the NYU Silver School of Social Work will train those with a master's in social work for nonprofit leadership positions and fund the establishment of a Social Work Leadership Development Institute.
 The New York Times highlighted The trust's NYC COVID-19 Response and Impact Fund, established to help nonprofits survive during the pandemic. 
 During the COVID-19 pandemic, the New York Times and the Wall Street Journal reported that charitable giving had risen during the pandemic, including giving to the trust. 
 The Wall Street Journal reported on the Bridge to Craft Careers program that helps underrepresented young New Yorkers acquire skills in masonry, and eventually well-paying jobs.

References

 The New York Community Trust. http://www.nycommunitytrust.org. Retrieved on January 17, 2019
 Results. https://www.nycommunitytrust.org/results/. Retrieved on January 17, 2019.
 Collaborative Funds. https://www.nycommunitytrust.org/results/collaborative-funds/. Retrieved on January 17, 2019.
 A Look Behind the Scenes at the Impact of our Advocacy Work: Nine Recent Victories https://www.nycommunitytrust.org/newsroom/a-look-behind-the-scenes-at-the-impact-of-our-advocacy-work-nine-recent-victories/. Published on July 16, 2019.
 The New York Community Trust. https://fconline.foundationcenter.org/fdo-grantmaker-profile/?key=NEWY001. Last updated December 21, 2018.
 The New York Community Trust & Community Funds, Inc. https://www.guidestar.org/profile/13-3062214. Retrieved on January 18, 2019.

1924 establishments in New York City
Charities based in New York City
Community foundations based in the United States